King Ding of Zhou, personal name Ji Yu, was the twenty-first king of the Chinese Zhou dynasty and the ninth of Eastern Zhou. He was a son of King Qing of Zhou and brother of King Kuang of Zhou. 

He sent an official named Wangsun Man to present gifts to the Chu army. He met Prince Zhuang.

Family
Spouse:
 Queen Ding of Zhou, of the Jiang clan of Qi, possibly a daughter of Duke Hui of Qi; married in 603 BC

Sons:
 Prince Yi (d. 572 BC), ruled as King Jian of Zhou from 585–572 BC

Ancestry

See also
Family tree of ancient Chinese emperors

Sources 

586 BC deaths
Zhou dynasty kings
6th-century BC Chinese monarchs
7th-century BC Chinese monarchs
Year of birth unknown